Randy Lavelle Williams (born August 23, 1953) is an American athlete.

Education
In high school, Williams attended Edison High School in Fresno, California. He then attended the University of Southern California.

Competition
At the CIF California State Meet in 1969 he finished third, behind future rival James McAlister, in 1970 he finished second behind future NFL star, Lynn Swann and in 1971, he won the meet in what would have clearly been a meet record, had it not been wind aided.

Williams won the sprints at the 1987 Masters West Region Championship.

Olympics
Williams mainly competed in the long jump, in which he won a gold medal at the 1972 Olympics and a silver medal in 1976.  His 1972 winning jump of 8.34 m (27–4½) set the world junior record that stood for almost 40 years until it was improved by 1 cm by Sergey Morgunov on June 20, 2012.  At the time it was the longest standing record on the books. Williams qualified for the 1980 U.S. Olympic team but was unable to compete due to the 1980 Summer Olympics boycott. In 2007 he did receive one of 461 Congressional Gold Medals created especially for the spurned athletes.

Hall of Fame
In 2009, Williams was inducted into the National Track and Field Hall of Fame.

References

1953 births
American male long jumpers
Olympic gold medalists for the United States in track and field
Olympic silver medalists for the United States in track and field
Athletes (track and field) at the 1972 Summer Olympics
Athletes (track and field) at the 1976 Summer Olympics
University of Southern California alumni
Sportspeople from Fresno, California
Living people
Track and field athletes from California
Medalists at the 1976 Summer Olympics
Medalists at the 1972 Summer Olympics
American masters athletes